Uncontacted peoples are groups of indigenous peoples living without sustained contact with neighbouring communities and the world community. Groups who decide to remain uncontacted are referred to as indigenous peoples in voluntary isolation. Legal protections make estimating the total number of uncontacted peoples challenging, but estimates from the Inter-American Commission on Human Rights in the UN and the non-profit group Survival International point to between 100 and 200 uncontacted peoples numbering up to 10,000 individuals. A majority of uncontacted peoples live in South America, particularly northern Brazil, where the Brazilian government and National Geographic estimate between 77 and 84 tribes reside.

Knowledge of uncontacted peoples comes mostly from encounters with neighbouring indigenous communities and aerial footage.

Definition 
Uncontacted peoples generally refers to indigenous peoples who have remained largely isolated to the present day, maintaining their traditional lifestyles and functioning mostly independently from any political or governmental entities. However, European exploration and colonization during the early modern period brought indigenous peoples worldwide into contact with colonial settlers and explorers. As such, most indigenous groups have had some form of contact with other peoples. The term "uncontacted" therefore refers to a lack of sustained contact with the majority of non-indigenous society at the present time.

The Inter-American Commission on Human Rights refers to uncontacted peoples as "indigenous peoples in voluntary isolation." These groups are defined by their general rejection of contact with anyone outside of their own people. This definition also includes groups who have previously had sustained contact with the majority non-indigenous society but have chosen to return to isolation and no longer maintain contact. As such uncontacted peoples are understood not as living in an anachronistic state of nature but rather as contemporaries of modernity.

A 2009 United Nations report also classified "peoples in initial contact" as sharing the same characteristics but beginning to regularly communicate with and integrate into mainstream society.

To highlight their agency in staying uncontacted or isolated, international organizations emphasize calling them "indigenous peoples in isolation" or "in voluntary isolation". Otherwise they have also been called "hidden peoples" or "uncontacted tribes".

Historically European colonial ideas of uncontacted peoples, and their colonial claims over them, were informed by the imagination of and search for Prester John, king of a wealthy Christian realm in isolation, as well as the Ten Lost Tribes of Israel, identifying uncontacted peoples as "lost tribes".

Relations with outsiders 
International organizations have highlighted the importance of protecting indigenous peoples' environment and lands, the importance of protecting them from exploitation or abuse, and the importance of no contact in order to prevent the spread of modern diseases.

Historic exploitation and abuse at the hands of the majority group have led many governments to give uncontacted people their lands and legal protection. Many indigenous groups live on national forests or protected grounds, such as the Vale do Javari in Brazil or the North Sentinel Island in India.

Much of the contention over uncontacted peoples has stemmed from governments' desire to extract natural resources. In the 1960s and 1970s, Brazil's federal government attempted to assimilate and integrate native groups living in the Amazon jungle in order to use their lands for farming. Their efforts were met with mixed success and criticism until, in 1987, Brazil created the Department of Isolated Indians inside of FUNAI (Fundação Nacional do Índio), Brazil's Indian Agency. FUNAI was successful in securing protected lands which have allowed certain groups to remain relatively uncontacted until the present day.

A different outcome occurred in Colombia when the Nukak tribe of indigenous people was contacted by an evangelical group. The tribe was receptive to trade and eventually moved in order to have closer contact with settlers. This led to an outbreak of respiratory infections, violent clashes with narco-traffickers, and the death of hundreds of the Nukak, more than half of the tribe. Eventually, the Colombian government forcibly relocated the tribe to a nearby town where they received food and government support but were reported as living in poverty.

The threats to the Nukak tribe are generally shared by all peoples in isolation, particularly the outside world's desire to exploit their lands. This can include lumbering, ranching and farming, land speculation, oil prospecting and mining, and poaching. For example, then Peruvian President Alan García claimed in 2007 that uncontacted groups were only a "fabrication of environmentalists bent on halting oil and gas exploration". As recently as 2016, a Chinese subsidiary mining company in Bolivia ignored signs that they were encroaching on uncontacted tribes, and attempted to cover it up. In addition to commercial pursuits, other people such as missionaries can inadvertently cause great damage.

It was those threats, combined with attacks on their tribe by illegal cocaine traffickers, that led a group of Acre Indians to make contact with a village in Brazil and subsequently with the federal government in 2014. This behaviour suggests that many tribes are aware of the outside world and choose not to make contact unless motivated by fear or self-interest. Satellite images suggest that some tribes intentionally migrate away from roads or logging operations in order to remain secluded.

Indigenous rights activists have often advocated that indigenous peoples in isolation be left alone, saying that contact will interfere with their right to self-determination as peoples. On the other hand, experience in Brazil suggests isolating peoples might want to have trading relationships and positive social connections with others, but choose isolation out of fear of conflict or exploitation. The Brazilian state organization National Indian Foundation (FUNAI) in collaboration with anthropological experts has chosen to make controlled initial contact with tribes. The organization operates 15 trading posts throughout protected territory where tribes can trade for metal tools and cooking instruments. The organization also steps in to prevent some conflicts and deliver vaccinations. However, FUNAI has been critical of political will in Brazil, reporting that it only received 15% of its requested budget in 2017. In 2018, after consensus among field agents, FUNAI released videos and images of several tribes under their protection. Although the decision was criticized, the director of the Isolated Indian department, Bruno Pereira, responded that "The more the public knows and the more debate around the issue, the greater the chance of protecting isolated Indians and their lands". He shared that the organization has been facing mounting political pressure to open up lands to commercial companies. He also justified the photography by explaining that FUNAI was investigating a possible massacre against the Flechieros tribe.

Recognizing the myriad problems with contact, the United Nations Human Rights Council in 2009 and the Inter-American Commission on Human Rights in 2013 introduced guidelines and recommendations that included a right to choose self-isolation.

There have been reports of human safaris in India's Andaman Islands and in Peru, where tourism companies attempt to help tourists see uncontacted or recently contacted peoples. This practice is controversial.

By region

India 

India is home to two uncontacted tribes, both living on islands in the Andaman Island chain.

Sentinelese 
The Sentinelese people of North Sentinel Island, which lies near South Andaman Island in the Bay of Bengal, reject contact. Attempts to contact them have usually been rebuffed, sometimes with lethal force. Their language is markedly different from other languages of the Andamans, which suggests that they have been isolated for thousands of years. They have been called by experts the most isolated people in the world, and they are likely to remain so.

During the 2001 Census of India, a joint expedition conducted during 23–24 February 2001 identified at least a few dozen individuals, but it was not exhaustive. Helicopter surveys after the 2004 Indian Ocean tsunami confirmed the Sentinelese had survived, and there have been a few limited interactions with them since. The local Andaman and Nicobar administration has adopted an "eyes-on and hands-off" policy to ensure that no poachers enter the island. A protocol for circumnavigation of North Sentinel Island has been made and notified in consultation with the Indian government.

Individuals have occasionally attempted to contact them, although such attempts are against the law. In November 2018, American missionary John Allen Chau was killed by the Sentinelese during an illegal expedition to the island, where Chau had intended to convert the tribe to Christianity.

Andamanese 
Another Andamanese tribe, the Jarawas, live on the main islands, largely isolated from other peoples. They are thought to number a few hundred people.

South America

Bolivia 
The Toromona are an uncontacted people living near the upper Madidi River and the Heath Rivers in northwestern Bolivia. The government has created an "exclusive, reserved, and inviolable" portion of the Madidi National Park to protect the Toromona. The group faced encroachment from a Chinese mining company in 2016.

Among the Ayoreo people of the Gran Chaco are a small number of uncontacted nomadic hunter-gatherers in the Kaa-Iya del Gran Chaco National Park and Integrated Management Natural Area.

Pacahuaras are believed to be living in voluntary isolation in Pando Department.

Brazil 

Until the 1970s, Brazil attempted unsuccessfully to move anyone on lands that could be commercially cultivated. In 2007, FUNAI reported the presence of 67 uncontacted indigenous peoples in Brazil, up from 40 in 2005.

The Awá are people living in the eastern Amazon rainforest. There are approximately 350 members, and 100 of them have no contact with the outside world. They are considered highly endangered because of conflicts with logging interests in their territory.

The Kawahiva live in the north of Mato Grosso. They are constantly on the move and have little contact with outsiders. Thus, they are known primarily from physical evidence they have left behind: arrows, baskets, hammocks, and communal houses.

The Korubu live in the lower Vale do Javari in the western Amazon Basin. Other tribes may include the Uru-Eu-Wau-Wau, and the Himarimã. There may be uncontacted peoples in Uru-Eu-Uaw-Uaw Indigenous Territory and Kampa Indigenous Territory and Envira River Isolated Peoples.

In 2019, some isolated groups of one to two people came to the media's attention. Two brothers of the Piripkura tribe had continued to live alone in the jungle but initiated contact with FUNAI after a fire they had kept burning for 18 years went out. They were the subsequent focus of the documentary Piripkura. Another man colloquially called the "Man of the Hole" lived alone on  where he dug hundreds of holes for farming and trapping. He was found dead in his hammock, in a self-made dwelling, in August 2022.

As of 2021, uncontacted peoples in Brazil are threatened by illegal land grabbers, loggers, and gold miners. Additionally, the government of Jair Bolsonaro signalled its intention to develop the Amazon and reduce the size of indigenous reservations.

Colombia 
With the creation of gigantic tribal reserves and strict patrolling, Colombia is now regarded as one of the countries that offers maximum protection to uncontacted indigenous people.

The Nukak people are nomadic hunter-gatherers living between the Guaviare and Inírida rivers in south-east Colombia at the headwaters of the northwest Amazon basin.

Ecuador 
Two isolated indigenous peoples of Ecuador live in the Amazon region: the Tagaeri and the Taromenane. Both are eastern Huaorani peoples living in Yasuni National Park. These semi-nomadic people live in small groups, subsisting on hunting, gathering, and some crops. They are organized into extended families. Since 2007 there is a national policy which mandates: untouchability, self-determination, equality, and no contact. In 2013, more than 20 Taromenane were killed by other Huaorani.

Paraguay 
Approximately 100 Ayoreo people, some of whom are in the Totobiegosode tribe, live uncontacted in the forest. They are nomadic, and they hunt, forage, and conduct limited agriculture. They are the last uncontacted peoples south of the Amazon basin, and are in Amotocodie. Threats to them include rampant illegal deforestation. According to Survival International, Brazilian company Yaguarete Porá S.A. is converting thousands of hectares of the Ayoreo-Totobiegosode tribe's ancestral territory into cattle ranching land. The Union of Ayoreo Natives of Paraguay is working for their protection, with support from the Iniciativa Amotocodie.

Peru 
The Mashco-Piro are nomadic Arawak hunter-gatherers who inhabit Manú National Park in Peru. In 1998, the International Work Group for Indigenous Affairs estimated their number to be around 100 to 250. They speak a dialect of the Piro languages. Amid incursions on their land, the tribe has made it clear they do not wish to be contacted. As of 2013, all the bands seem to be surviving. Other groups include the Machiguenga, Nanti, Asháninka, Mayoruna, Isconahua, Kapanawa, Yora, Murunahua, Chitonahua, Mastanahua, Kakataibo, and Pananujuri. Many of them speak dialects of Panoan languages. There are five reserves for uncontacted peoples. However, the law designed to protect those peoples does not prevent economic operations there.

Venezuela 
In Venezuela some groups from the Hoti, Yanomami, and Piaroa tribes live in relative isolation. The Ministry of Indigenous Peoples has no policies designed to protect these people specifically.

New Guinea 
There are over 40 uncontacted tribes living in West Papua region in Indonesia, although contact is usually established upon their initial encounter. While it is illegal for journalists and other organizations to enter West Papua, there is no dedicated government agency to protect isolated indigenous groups. Human rights organizations, including Survival International, have argued that there is a need to raise awareness of the existence of uncontacted tribes, for example, to prevent the development of infrastructure near their lands. On the other hand, remaining vague about the exact location and size of the tribe may help to avoid encouraging contact.

Historical

Australia
The Pintupi Nine lived a traditional life in the Gibson Desert of Australia until 1984, having earlier split off from another group of Pintupi people.

United States
Ishi, a member of the Yahi people of Northern California, remained in voluntary isolation from the outside world until 1911 and was acclaimed as the "last wild Indian".

See also 

 Isolationism
 List of contemporary ethnic groups
 Noble savage
 Stateless society
 Terra nullius

References

Further reading 
 Wallace, Scott (2011). The Unconquered: In Search of the Amazon's Last Uncontacted Tribes. Crown Publishers.
 Cabodevilla, Miguel Angel, and Aguirre, Milagros (2013). [http://polificcion.files.wordpress.com/2013/09/una-tragedia-ocultada-corregida-2-1.pdf Una Tragedia Ocultada: the story of the killing in 2013 of more than 20 uncontacted Taromenane Indians by armed settled Indians.

External links 

 Indigenous Peoples Issues & Resources
 Cultural Survival

 
Stone Age
Indigenous peoples